The 1970 Brisbane Rugby League season was the 62nd season of the Brisbane Rugby League premiership. Eight teams from across Brisbane competed for the premiership, which culminated in Fortitude Valley defeating Northern Suburbs 13–11 in the grand final, ending Valleys' 13-year premiership drought. Southern Suburbs' Graeme Atherton was named the Rothmans Medalist (Best and Fairest) - the first Southern Suburbs player to win the award.

Ladder

Finals 

Source:

References 

1970 in rugby league
1970 in Australian rugby league
Rugby league in Brisbane